Westwater is an unincorporated Navajo Nation-owned community situated on 120 acres near Blanding, Utah.

Since it is not a census-designated place, the exact population is unknown. Different sources cite a population of 16 families and 29 families.

References

Unincorporated communities in San Juan County, Utah
Geography of the Navajo Nation